François-Louis Gounod (26 March 1758 – 5 May 1825) was a French painter.

Gounod is primarily known through his works. He took second prize of the Prix de Rome in 1783. He married a piano teacher, and his son Charles Gounod became an award-winning composer.

References
 According to the historian Théodore Gosselin, Les Tuileries, page 69, François-Louis Gounod was the son of a king furbisher housed at the Tuileries Palace
 The New Grove Dictionary of Music and Musicians 5th ed. 1954

1758 births
1825 deaths
18th-century French painters
19th-century French painters
French male painters
Prix de Rome for painting
19th-century French male artists
18th-century French male artists